The Adjutant General of North Carolina is the head of the North Carolina National Guard.  The position was created in 1806, when the Militia Acts of 1792 required the state to establish the position to better train the state militia. The office is appointed by the Governor of North Carolina and requires five years prior military service.

History 
In its early history, North Carolina's militia lacked organization. Following the passage of the Militia Acts of 1792 and 1795 by the United States Congress, the North Carolina General Assembly created the Department of the Adjutant General in 1806 to provide more structure to the militia system. The statutory duties of the adjutant general were to pass orders from the governor to the militia, supplying forms to militia officers, attending reviews of forces, and reporting to the governor, the General Assembly, and the president of the United States.

Shortly after North Carolina seceded from the United States in 1861 and joined the Confederate States of America to fight in the American Civil War, the General Assembly passed a new militia law which authorized the adjutant general to serve as quartermaster and paymaster general and chief of ordnance of North Carolina's forces. The defeat of the Confederacy left the militia and the Department of the Adjutant General disorganized. In 1877 the General Assembly reorganized the militia into the North Carolina State Guard, still under the leadership of the adjutant general. During the Spanish–American War of 1898, state guard forces were not called into federal service, but the Department of the Adjutant General reorganized the North Carolina forces to allow members to leave and volunteer for federal duty. In 1903 the name of the North Carolina State Guard was changed to North Carolina National Guard in compliance with federal legislation. 

The adjutant general assisted with federal deployments of the National Guard during the Pancho Villa Expedition and World War I, and helped administer the Selective Service System. The Department of the Adjutant General also assisted with a post-war reorganization of the National Guard. In 1941 the General Assembly passed a law mandating that the adjutant general reestablished the State Guard while the state National Guard units were pressed into federal service, which had occurred due to the outbreak of World War II. The State Guard was disbanded in 1947 as the National Guard was relinquished from federal duty, and the adjutant general assisted with the post-war reorganization.

Duties and structure 
The adjutant general is appointed by the governor of North Carolina. A candidate for the office is required to have at least five years of active service in the United States Armed Forces. The adjutant general serves as the director of the North Carolina National Guard.

List of Adjutant Generals 
This is a list of persons who have held the office of Adjutant General of North Carolina.

References

Works cited 
 

Military in North Carolina
Adjutants general of the National Guard of the United States